Telangana State Power Generation Corporation Limited is a division of Telangana State Electricity Board. It is responsible for power generation in thr state of Telangana. It has ceased to do power trading and has retained with powers of controlling system operations of power generation after formation of Telangana state.

Telangana State Power Generation Corporation Limited has been incorporated under companies Act, 2013, on 19 May 2014 and commenced its operations from 2 June 2014.

History
The erstwhile Andhra Pradesh State Electricity Board which came into existence in 1959 was responsible for generation, transmission and distribution of electricity. Under the Electricity Sector Reforms agenda, government of Andhra Pradesh promulgated Andhra Pradesh Electricity Reforms Act, 1998. The erstwhile APSEB was unbundled into one generating company (APGENCO), one transmission company (APTRANSCO) and four distribution companies (APDISCOMs) as part of the reform process.

Later, on 2 June 2014, when the state was bifurcated, APGENCO distributed all the assets, liabilities and power stations to both the states and Telangana Power Generation Corporation (TSGENCO) was formed for the newly formed Telangana state and APGENCO remained for Andhra Pradesh in accordance with the Andhra Pradesh Reorganisation Act, 2014. All the plants (thermal, hydel and solar) located in Telangana region were transferred to Telangana Genco on an "as is where is" basis.

Mission
To spearhead accelerated power development by planning and implementing new power projects.
To generate adequate and reliable power most economically, efficiently and eco-friendly.
To implement renovation and modernisation of all existing units and enhance their performance.

Power Plants of TSGENCO 

The power plants of TSGENCO are

Thermal-Coal based

Hydro-Water based

Non-Conventional Plants

See also
 List of Power Stations in Telangana
 Transmission Corporation of Telangana
 Solar power in India
 Wind power in India
 Torrefaction
 Central Electricity Authority (India)
 Economics of new nuclear power plants
 Demand response
 National Grid (Great Britain)
 Spark spread
 Electricity market
 Electricity Act (2003)

References

Electric-generation companies of India
Energy in Telangana
State agencies of Telangana
State electricity agencies of India
Industries in Hyderabad, India
Indian companies established in 2014
2014 establishments in Telangana